Erumbali is a village in the Annavasal revenue block of Pudukkottai district, Tamil Nadu, India.

Demographics 
As per the 2001 census, Erumbali had a total population of 1222 with 630 males and 592 females. The sex ratio was 1015. The literacy rate was 57.20%

References

Villages in Pudukkottai district